Tepidanaerobacteraceae is a family of Gram positive bacteria in the class Clostridia.

References 

Bacteria families
Clostridia
Thermophiles
Anaerobes